Rob Halverson is an American record producer, songwriter and studio engineer, who lives in Austin, Texas.  He is also a film composer.

The Austin Chronicle claims Halverson "a low-key but nonetheless very important figure in Austin music since 1989". He has performed tours of Australia twice, and has toured in Europe and UK numerous times.   He has released two solo records,  and six instrumental albums with  Thor Harris. Halverson has recorded or produced over 100 albums.

Discography 
partial
 1999: Fields of Innards w/ An Ocean of Despair by Thor & Rob Halverson (self-released)
 2009: Drums and Drunken Circuit Bender by Thor & Rob Halverson (self-released)
 2010: Fields of Innards II by Thor & Rob Halverson (self-released)
 2011: R.O.A.R. by Thor & Rob Halverson (self-released)

References

External links
 Rob Halverson Website
 Halversonics Recording Austin
 Rob Halverson's upcoming Grapes of Wrath 75 Project

1963 births
Living people
American male songwriters
American record producers